Désirée van der Walt (born 20 April 1956) is a South African politician. She has been serving as a Member of the National Assembly of South Africa for the opposition Democratic Alliance (DA) since 2014. She previously served in the Assembly from 2004 to 2010. She represented the party in the Limpopo Provincial Legislature from 2010 to 2014. Van der Walt has held various leadership positions in the Democratic Alliance and the Shadow Cabinet.

Early life
Désirée van der Walt was born in Pietersburg in the Transvaal Province. She is the eldest of four children. Her father died while she was a young child. She had the aspirations to become an educator, but could not due to financial constraints. She was then employed by a banking institution. She later married and gave birth to two daughters. Van der Walt briefly worked for the National Department of Education.

Political career
Van der Walt was elected to the Roodepoort City Council in 1995 and served until 2000. She was elected as a Tzaneen Municipality councillor in 2000 and served until her election to the National Assembly in 2004. She served as the DA's  Spokesperson on Arts and Culture. She was elected as the Provincial Leader of the Limpopo Democratic Alliance in 2008.

Van der Walt was re-elected to a second term as a Member of the National Assembly in 2009, but she resigned as an MP on 10 September 2010, as she was sworn in as a Member of the Limpopo Provincial Legislature.

In 2012, DA MP Jacques Smalle unseated her as Provincial Leader of the party.

She returned to the National Assembly of South Africa in 2014. She took office on 21 May 2014. The newly elected DA Parliamentary Leader Mmusi Maimane selected her to be the Shadow Deputy Minister of Basic Education. Later on, she assumed the role of Shadow Minister of Public Service and Administration.

Van der Walt was elected the Deputy Provincial Chairperson of the Democratic Alliance in February 2015. She was elected as one of three Deputy Federal Chairpersons of the Democratic Alliance at the party's Federal Congress in May 2015. She served alongside Ivan Meyer and Refiloe Nt'sekhe until 2018 when she was defeated for re-election.

She was elected Provincial Chairperson of the Democratic Alliance Women's Network in October 2017, as Lindy Wilson succeeded her as Deputy Provincial Chairperson.

In 2018, she was appointed the head of the Democratic Alliance's Mopani constituency. She was previously head of the party's Waterberg South constituency.

On 5 June 2019, Van der Walt was named Shadow Deputy Minister of Basic Education.

Personal life
Van der Walt was in a relationship with Manny de Gouveia for 10 years. They lived together in Tzaneen. De Gouveia died from COVID-19 on 22 January 2021 during the COVID-19 pandemic in South Africa.

References

External links
Parliament of South Africa profile

Living people
Democratic Alliance (South Africa) politicians
Members of the National Assembly of South Africa
Women members of the National Assembly of South Africa
White South African people
Women members of provincial legislatures of South Africa
21st-century South African women politicians
21st-century South African politicians
1956 births
Members of the Limpopo Provincial Legislature